This is a list of reportedly haunted locations in India.

Delhi

Agrasen Ki baoli, New Delhi: A 60-meter long and 15-meter wide historical step well in Delhi, it is considered by believers to be haunted.
 Bhuli Bhatiyari Ka Mahal, Karol Bagh: Ruins of a 14th-century hunting lodge that is believed by some to be haunted. It is situated in the busy market of Karol Bagh. A huge statue of Lord Hanuman can be seen on the road which serves as a landmark in Karol Bagh. People identify the nearby areas from the statue. Bagga Link is adjacent to this statue and behind this Bagga Link there is a silent road which takes you to the Southern Ridge of Delhi.  Bhuli Bhatiyari Ka Mahal was built by Firuz Shah Tughlaq in the 14th century. Sources say that it was basically a hunting lodge during the reign of Firuz Shah Tughlaq. The entrance  of Bhuli Bhatiyari Ka Mahal is made up of stones and a big gate can be noticed in the front. And there is another small door which ends into a big open courtyard.
 Delhi Cantonment, New Delhi: Also known as Delhi Cantt. The more desolate parts of this area are considered by believers to be haunted, including the supposedly white-clad female hitchhiker.
 Jamali Kamali Mosque and Tomb, Mehrauli: Located in the archaeological village complex in Mehrauli, the complex is said to be haunted. There have been reports of people being slapped by invisible forces and hearing ghostly voices from adjoining graves. As a result, the fakirs call upon Jinns on every Thursday.
 Lothian Cemetery, Old Delhi: Said by believers to be haunted by the specter of General Nicholas, a British officer who committed suicide after learning that the woman he loved had married another man.

Gujarat

 Dumas Beach, Surat: A coastal town of Gujarat, is said to be haunted.

 Bharvi Tower, Ahmedabad:- It is a residential building in Ahmedabad. But according to some people who are residing near to the building, there are some spirits wondering near the lobby has been seen after 11:00 PM(at night). It is said to be haunted.

Maharashtra

 Grand Paradi Towers, Mumbai: Said to be the most famous haunted building in Mumbai, Maharashtra, as it was the site of several suicides and deaths.
 Shaniwar Wada, Pune: An 18th-century fortification in the city of Pune, built in 1732 as the seat of the Peshwa rulers of the Maratha Empire until 1818, when the Peshwas lost control to the East India Company after the Third Anglo-Maratha War. The fort is said to be haunted by the ghost of the fifth Peshwa Narayanrao, who was murdered in 1773, by guards on orders of his uncle Raghunathrao and aunt Anandibai.
 Taj Mahal Palace Hotel, Mumbai: A heritage five-star luxury hotel located in the Colaba region of Mumbai, it was the main target of the 2008 Mumbai attacks. But believers claim the hotel, specifically the Old Wing, is haunted by the ghost of the English engineer W. A. Chambers who completed the project, jumped off from the 5th floor of the hotel in frustration after knowing that the hotel was constructed not in accordance of his plan.

Rajasthan

 Bhangarh Fort, Bhangarh: Bhangarh in Rajasthan was purportedly brought to ruin as a consequence of the curse of Baba Balanath. Another legend attributes it to the curse of the sorcerer Singhiya. Entering the site before sunrise and after sunset is not allowed.
 Brijraj Bhawan Palace Hotel, Kota: Considered one of the beautiful heritage hotels in the state, it is a former home to a royal family of Rajasthan. It is reportedly haunted by the ghost of British officer Major Burton, who together with his family stayed at the palace for 13 years, before he was killed by Indian sepoys during the Indian Rebellion of 1857.
 Kuldhara: A site in Jaisalmer district, once a prosperous village inhabited by Paliwal Brahmins from 13th to early 19th centuries. Local legends hold that the Paliwals cursed the village with a haunting to frighten anyone who tried to occupy it. A 2010 film "Kaalo" is said to be losely based on this place. The film was disaster on box office. The local residents around the area do not believe in the legends, but propagate them for tourism. The Indian Paranormal Society's Gaurav Tiwari believes the village is haunted.

Telangana

 Golconda Fort, Hyderabad: A citadel and fort west of Hyderabad, Telangana that served as the capital of the medieval sultanate of the Qutb Shahi dynasty (circa 1518–1687). It is reported by believers to be haunted by ghosts of soldiers as well as the specter of a dancer named Taramati, who was one of the most famous courtesans of the said dynasty. The sound of her ghunghroo can be heard sometimes.
 Rajiv Gandhi International Airport, Hyderabad: The main gateway to Hyderabad, also known as Shamshabad Airport, is considered by believers to be haunted by the ghosts of those killed during its construction.
 Ramoji Film City, Hyderabad: According to legend, ghosts haunt the location because the site was once the war grounds of the Nizam and before that a burial ground for robbers.

Uttarakhand
Mussoorie: According to legend, a witch screams and walks the mountains of Mussoorie, Uttarakhand.
 Savoy Hotel, Mussoorie: The ghost of Lady Garnet Orme is said to roam inside the hotel searching for her murderer. It is said that Orme was murdered by mixing a rodent killer in her food. Her doctor was found dead under suspicious circumstances after that. Now this hotel has been reconstructed by ITC Limited and no ghost sightings have been reported.
 Strawberry Lodge, Nainital: Dinesh Chaudhary, the owner of the house admitted something wrong with his apartment. Also neighbours hear strange voices coming from the apartment while there is no one in the apartment around 2AM - 4AM. 4 people lost their life dramatically in the apartment and this mystery remain unsolved.

West Bengal

 Dow Hill, Kurseong: Dow Hill in Kurseong is considered by believers to be one of the most haunted places in West Bengal, especially in the corridors of Victoria Boys' School and in the surrounding woods. A number of murders have taken place in the forest.
 Ghats on the Ganges under Howrah Bridge, Kolkata: The site of several deaths (either due to suicide or drowning accidents), believers speculate that many spirits wander this sacred river Ganges.
 Hastings House, Kolkata: This is one of the oldest buildings in the Alipore region of Kolkata. It was constructed by Governor-General Warren Hastings, and later it became the Governor's residence. Now, University of Calcutta runs a women's college here. Many students have reported the sights of ghosts inside the building and on the grounds.
 Morgan House, Kalimpong is a colonial era mansion in Kalimpong, considered to be one of the most haunted locations in India. Morgan House was built in the typical British architecture of Victorian rectory in the early 1930s. The building was to commemorate the wedding of an indigo owner with a jute baron George Morgan. The property was used as a summer retreat and elaborate parties were hosted. It passed into the hand of trustees after Mr. and Mrs. Morgan died without heir. Several sightings of Lady Morgan have been reported.
 Dub Pukur, Haldia: Now a pond surrounded by modern buildings, it still instills fear amongst the local people. It is said that in early 18th century, the midwife of the Royals of Mahishadal Rajbari was accused of witchcraft and devouring the children. She was tied and taken far away from Mahishadal, into the deep forests on the banks of Haldi River, and was forcefully drowned in a pond and murdered in a dark night.  Since then, every 25 years on the night of Bhoot Chaturdashi (the 14th day of Krishna Paksha), reports of a blood-curdling scream from the pond are heard, and a person goes missing, whose body is later found floating in the pond on the morning of Diwali. The muddy pond is situated in Haldia Township.

 Nimtala Crematorium, Kolkata: It is one of the oldest ghats in central Kolkata. Because dead bodies are cremated there according to Hindu rituals, it is said to be haunted.
 Rabindra Sarobar metro station, Kolkata: It is a busy station of the city's rapid transit system. It is claimed to be haunted by the spirits of people who commit suicide.
 South Park Street Cemetery, Kolkata: one of the oldest cemeteries in Park Street, Kolkata. Constructed in 1767, and featuring the graves British soldiers, is claimed to be haunted.
 Writers' Building, Kolkata: Various stories and legends claim that Writers' Building near the B.B.D. Bagh, Kolkata, that serves as the secretariat of the Government of West Bengal, is haunted by spirits of the dead.

Kerala 

 25 GB Bungalow Bonacaud, Trivandrum: One of the most haunted places in Kerala in night. And a tourist destination for adventure seekers in day time. Once owned by a British landlord and his wife, the bungalow sits on top a hill and has a 360° view of the surrounding estate and tea plantation. Its said that children of that landlord who died under mysterious circumstances owing to a disease are haunting the now abandoned bungalow. People claimed to hear voices speaking British accent English in or around from the bungalow and lights glowing despite no electricity connection in the bungalow. Other paranormal activities reported are a shadowy figure of child roaming around the building and sounds of glass breaking.

  Lakkidi Gateway, Wayanad: Situated in the Wayanad region of Kerala, Lakkidi Gateway is the shortest route to cross the Thamarassery pass. However, the discovery of this route is the thing that has changed the door into one of the scariest places in Kerala. It is said that in ancient times, multiple times British tried to navigate and find a transportation way through Lakkidi connecting Kozhikode and Wayanad and failed multiple times. The legend is that a British professional took help from a local individual named Karinthandan to discover transportation route through Lakkidi and to has taken the credit for finding the way himself, and he killed Karinthandan, for forbidding the truth. Afterwards, many explorers passing the new course revealed the meandering of the spirit of Karinthandan. A cleric was called, an exile was performed to bind the forsaken soul to a tree. Incredibly, the chain has developed with the tree which people accept to be the spirit that has not liberated till now. Trespassers have seen the terrifying screeches and shout around evening time.
Kariavattom, Trivandrum: Located in the capital of the state - Kariavattom is home to technopark, the largest IT park in Kerala. There are more than one destination here, where people have experienced certain paranormal activities.

See also
 List of reportedly haunted locations

References

Lists of places in India
 
India